Charles Beatty Morton (February 2, 1833 – January 16, 1922) was an American politician from New York.

Life 
Morton was born on February 2, 1833, in Troy, New York. He attended the Albany Academy from 1840 to 1849.

Morton moved to Brooklyn in 1855. He was a member of the Metropolitan Police Department from 1857 to 1861. In April 1861, when Abraham Lincoln first called for "three months' men" to fight in the American Civil War, he enlisted. After the three months expired, he promptly re-enlisted. He organized a company for the 13th Regiment of Brooklyn, served in the 47th Regiment of Brooklyn, and organized the 173rd New York Infantry Regiment. He became colonel of the latter regiment in 1862.

Morton was honorably discharged in 1863, at which point he became a recorder for the Board of Enrollment in the 2nd New York District. In 1866, he became the Deputy Auditor for the City of Brooklyn. In 1869, he became Chief Clerk of Internal Revenue for the 1st and 3rd Districts. In 1871, he was elected to the New York State Assembly as a Republican, representing the Kings County 7th District. He served in the Assembly in 1872.

Morton was Secretary of the New York City Police Department from 1875 to 1880, Assistant Postmaster of Brooklyn from 1877 to 1884, and an attache of the City Clerk's Office for over 20 years. He was a delegate to the 1894 New York State Constitutional Convention and a presidential elector for Charles Evans Hughes in the 1916 presidential election.

Morton was a member of the Grand Army of the Republic and the Freemasons. He was married to Harriet Lucinda Green.

Morton died at home from apoplexy on January 16, 1922. He was buried in Graham Cemetery in Hubbardsville.

References

External links 

 The Political Graveyard
 Charles B. Morton at Find a Grave

1833 births
1922 deaths
Politicians from Troy, New York
The Albany Academy alumni
Politicians from Brooklyn
People of New York (state) in the American Civil War
Military personnel from New York City
Union Army colonels
19th-century American politicians
Republican Party members of the New York State Assembly
1916 United States presidential electors
American Freemasons
Burials in New York (state)